Tim Whitehead is an American ice hockey coach at Kimball Union Academy, a boarding school in Meriden, New Hampshire. He was formerly the head coach at Maine for 12 years and Massachusetts-Lowell for 5.

Career
Whitehead spent four years at Hamilton College, graduating from the Division II school in 1985. After playing two years of professional hockey in Europe, Whitehead embarked on his coaching career, returning to the D-II college ranks as an assistant at Middlebury with Head Coach Bill Beaney for two years before joining the powerhouse program at Maine for the 1990–91 season. Whitehead's next stop was at Massachusetts-Lowell where he would remain as an assistant to Bruce Crowder for five years before replacing him in 1996. Whitehead would remain head coach of the River Hawks for a further five seasons before returning to Maine to replace his former boss Shawn Walsh who succumbed to cancer prior to the 2001–02 season.

While only an interim head coach in his first season with the Black Bears, Whitehead led the team all the way to the NCAA title game, losing to Minnesota 4–3 in overtime. Whitehead received the Spencer Penrose Award as the NCAA Division 1 National Coach of the Year for his efforts, as well as having the interim tag removed from his job title. Two years later Whitehead led Maine back to the championship match, this time losing 1–0 to Denver. The Black Bears won the Hockey East Championship that season in a thrilling 2-1 triple overtime victory over UMass. Whitehead's success in Orono would continue through the 2006–07 season including two more trips to the Frozen Four, but after four Frozen Fours in six years, the Black Bears slumped in 2008 and 2009. Maine would miss the NCAA tournament four consecutive years, until returning to the NCAA Northeast Regional in 2012. After an 11-win, injury-plagued season in 2012–13 Whitehead was fired by an athletic department trying to find a way to regain a revenue stream that had been declining for 5 years. Overall, Whitehead led the Black Bears to seven NCAA tournament appearances in his twelve years at Maine, a run that included two NCAA national championship games, four NCAA Frozen Fours, and the 2004 Hockey East Championship.

Shortly after leaving Maine, Whitehead was named as the head coach for Kimball Union Academy promptly leading the prep school to its second title in his first year behind the bench. After winning the NEPSAC Elite Division New England Championship in 2016–17, Whitehead's career record at KUA stands at 114-22-9.

Personal life
Tim lives in Meriden NH with his wife Dena and their two children, Natalie (18) and Zach (16).

Head coaching record

References

External links

Maine bio

Living people
1961 births
People from Lawrence Township, Mercer County, New Jersey
Sportspeople from Mercer County, New Jersey
American ice hockey coaches
Maine Black Bears men's ice hockey coaches
UMass Lowell River Hawks men's ice hockey coaches
Ice hockey players from New Jersey
Ice hockey coaches from New Jersey